Choya may refer to:
Choya, Argentina, a village and municipality in Catamarca Province, Argentina
Choya, Russia, a rural locality (a selo) in Choysky District of the Altai Republic, Russia
Choya Umeshu Co.,Ltd., a Japanese liqueur company